Fantastique is a French term for a literary and cinematic genre that overlaps with science fiction, horror, and fantasy.

The fantastique is a substantial genre within French literature.  Arguably dating back further than English language fantasy, it remains an active and productive genre which has evolved in conjunction with anglophone fantasy and horror and other French and international literature.

Definition

What is distinctive about the fantastique is the intrusion of supernatural phenomena into an otherwise realist narrative.  It evokes phenomena which are not only left unexplained but which are inexplicable from the reader's point of view.  In this respect, the fantastique is somewhere between fantasy, where the supernatural is accepted and entirely reasonable in the imaginary world of a non-realist narrative, and magic realism, where apparently supernatural phenomena are explained and accepted as normal.  Instead, characters in a work of fantastique are, just like the readers, unwilling to accept the supernatural events that occur.  This refusal may be mixed with doubt, disbelief, fear, or some combination of those reactions.

The Fantastique is often linked to a particular ambiance, a sort of tension in the face of the impossible.  A good deal of fear is often involved, either because the characters are afraid or because the author wants to provoke fright in the reader.  However, fear is not an essential component of fantastique.

Some theorists of literature, such as Tzvetan Todorov, contend that the fantastique is defined by its hesitation between accepting the supernatural as such and trying to rationally explain the phenomena it describes.  In that case, the fantastique is nothing more than a transitional area on a spectrum from magic realism to fantasy and does not qualify as a separate literary genre.

History

The Middle Ages
The fantastique began to become defined in the Middle Ages. The old Celtic and Germanic myths were translated from religion (implying belief and worship) into popular folklore (implying belief but not worship).

The root of modern thought about, and artistic depiction of, many things which are today often termed 'supernatural' (such as angels, demons, fairies, witches, etc.) has its beginnings in this period, often called the Middle Ages. Concepts and characters such as Melusine, Harlequin, Oberon, Morgan Le Fay etc., were first given their definitive shapes at this time.

Significant contributions of the times include:
 The chansons de geste [songs of deeds] such as La Chanson de Roland [The Song of Roland] (c. 1100), Le Roman de Tristan et Iseult [The Romance of Tristan and Ysolde] (c. 1170), Lancelot, ou Le Chevalier à la Charette [Lancelot, or The Knight of the Cart] (c. 1177) and Perceval, ou le Conte du Graal [Perceval, or The Tale of the Grail] (c. 1182), both by Chrétien de Troyes.
 Between 1215 and 1235, Robert de Boron, a successor of Chrétien de Troyes, published Histoire du Saint-Graal [The Story of the Holy Grail], Histoire de Merlin [The Story of Merlin], Le Livre de Lancelot du Lac [The Book of Lancelot of the Lake], La Quête du Saint-Graal [The Quest for the Holy Grail] and La Mort du Roi Arthu [The Death of King Arthur].  These books formed the basis for all subsequent Arthurian legends, and established the now well-known origins of the Holy Grail as the vessel in which Joseph of Arimathea collected the blood of Jesus Christ.
 The fabliaux, satirical fables which relied on the tradition established by Aesop of using anthropomorphic animals such as Le Roman de Renart, generally attributed to the poet Pierre de Saint-Cloud (c. 1175).  (By the 14th century, Le Roman de Renart included over 30 books.)
 Medieval poetry which often employed the supernatural as a mean of literary artifice, such as Le Roman de la Rose [The Romance of the Rose] by Guillaume de Lorris (c. 1230), the ballads of Marie de France (c. 1170), Le Jeu de la Feuillée [The Game of the Leaves] (c. 1275) by Adam de la Halle, and the anonymous Le Livre de la Fontaine Périlleuse [The Book of the Perilous Fountain] (c. 1425).
 The religious dramas called mysteries and miracle plays which often took several days to perform, and included spectacular stage effects, such as Le Jeu d'Adam [Play of Adam]; La Résurrection du Sauveur [Our Savior's Resurrection]; Le Jeu de Saint Nicolas [Play of Saint Nicolas] by Jean Bodel of Arras and the monumental Le Mystère de la Passion [Mystery of the Passion, or Passion Play] by Arnoul Gréban, organist and choirmaster of Notre Dame de Paris.

The Renaissance
The 16th century was marked by the emergence of new ideas and literary trends, often as a reaction against what was perceived as the "obscurantism" of the Middle Ages. Among the factors which contributed to the Renaissance were: the discoveries of new continents, new scientific and technical discoveries, and Johann Gutenberg's invention of the printing press which made the greater circulation of literary works possible.

The Renaissance bloomed in France during the reign of King Francis I who created a favorable environment for the development of letters, arts and sciences. It was during the French Renaissance that proto-science fiction first split from the fantastique.  The traditional fantastique derived from myths, legends and folklore also split into one form which continued the poetic tradition of the Middle Ages and eventually led to the Merveilleux [Marvelous] and the Contes de Fées or Fairy Tales, and the other, the darker side of the same literary coin, dealing with witchcraft and devil worship.

Significant contributions of the times include:
 In his Odes (1550), poet Pierre de Ronsard (1524–1585), founder of the literary group La Pleïade, often drew heavily on the superstitions of his native Vendômois country, writing about witches. Then, at the peak of his literary fame, he devoted several of his more famous Hymnes (1552) to supernatural subjects such as "Daimons" and astrology.
 The classic novel L'Astrée [Astrea] (1607–27) by Honoré d'Urfé was obviously inspired by the prose romance of chivalry Amadis de Gaula, which had been circulating since the late 13th century, but reached its pinnacle when reassembled by Spanish writer Garci Rodríguez de Montalvo.
 Famous playwright Pierre Corneille's lesser-known but classic tragedies, Médée (1635) and Circé (1675), popularized warlocks and witches as the deus ex machina of French theater.
 The Malleus Maleficarum spawned a number of French imitations, among which were Jean Bodin's La Démonomanie des Sorciers [Demonology Of Sorcerers] (1580) and Le Fléau des Démons et ses Sorciers [Plague Of Demons And Sorcerers] (1616).

The Age of Enlightenment
The 18th century was known as the Siècle des Lumières ("Century of Lights"), or Age of Enlightenment. Starting with the accession to the throne in 1643 of Sun King Louis XIV, France entered a period of political, artistic and scientific grandeur, before settling into the decadent reigns of Louis XV and Louis XVI. Enlightenment could arguably be said to have started with René Descartes in 1637 with his Le Discours de la Méthode ("Discourse on Methods") or in 1687 when Isaac Newton published his Philosophiae Naturalis Principia Mathematica ("Mathematical Principles of Natural Philosophy").

Baroque (whether in the form of novels, plays or even operas) was the link between the Merveilleux of the Renaissance and the more formalized fairy tales of the Enlightenment period. The undeniable popularity of the genre was, in great part, attributable to the fact that Fairy Tales were safe; they did not imperil the soul — a serious concern for a nation which had just come out of an era of great religious persecution — and they appropriately reflected the grandeur of the Sun King's reign.

The precursor in the genre was Madame d'Aulnoy who, in 1690, introduced in her rambling novel Histoire d'Hyppolite, Comte de Douglas ("Story Of Hippolyte, Count Of Douglas"), a fairy tale entitled L'Île de la Félicité ("The Island Of Happiness").

Significant contributions of the times include:
 In 1697, Charles Perrault, until then a renowned literary figure, a champion of sciences, released under his son's name Histoires ou Contes du Temps Passé ("Histories or Tales Of Past Times") a.k.a. Contes de ma Mère l'Oie ("Tales Of Mother Goose"). In it, Perrault had carefully collected a number of popular folk tales and legends, such as Cendrillon a.k.a. Cinderella, La Belle au Bois Dormant a.k.a. Sleeping Beauty, Peau d'Âne a.k.a. Donkey Skin, Le Petit Chaperon Rouge ("Little Red Riding Hood"), Barbe-Bleue ("Bluebeard"), Le Chat Botté ("Puss in Boots"), etc.
 Madame d'Aulnoy followed suit with a three-volume collection simply entitled Contes de Fées Fairy Tales, and then her Contes Nouveaux ou Les Fées à la Mode ("New Tales or Fairies In Fashion") (1698–1702). Her best-remembered stories are L'Oiseau Bleu ("The Blue Bird"), La Chatte Blanche  ("Puddocky"), and Le Nain Jaune ("The Yellow Dwarf"), which spawned a popular board game.
 The Book of One Thousand and One Nights was "translated" into French — and quite possibly made up from very thin or non-existent sources as no earlier Arabic manuscripts of Aladdin and Ali Baba are known to exist — by Antoine Galland from 1704 to 1717.
 In Zadig (1747), Voltaire mocked his contemporaries' predilection for the Fairy Tales, while making use of the same literary devices.
 Jeanne-Marie Leprince de Beaumont, whose classic La Belle et la Bête ("Beauty and the Beast"; 1757) has transcended the ages, authored forty collections of tales (dubbed "Magasins" or "Stores", hence the English word magazine), published in London between 1750 and 1780. La Belle et la Bête was, itself, based on an earlier fairy tale by Gabrielle-Suzanne Barbot de Villeneuve, included in her collection La jeune américaine et les contes marins ("The Young American Girl and Sea Stories"; 1740).
 Jacques Cazotte, who had started as a writer of Fairy Tales, such as La Patte du Chat ("Cat's Paw"; 1741) and Les Mille et Une Fadaises ("A Thousand and One Silly Stories"; 1742), soon tired of it and ended up writing darker tales.
 Chevalier  gathered the best Fairy Tales of the times and released a forty-one volume anthology entitled Le Cabinet des Fées ("The Fairies' Cabinet"), published in Amsterdam and Geneva between 1785 and 1789 — the first specialized fantasy imprint ever published.

In this fashion, the literary evolution of the Fairy Tales paralleled that of French Royalty, with the decadence and corruption of Louis XV replacing the aristocratic grandeur of Louis XIV. Writers like Cazotte embodied the transition between the Fairy Tales and a darker and grimmer fantastique.

As the spiritual influence of the Church waned, thinkers dreamed of new faiths. Many of these based their thinking on occult knowledge allegedly handed down through the ages, from the Orient to the Knights Templar and, finally, to the Freemasons and the Rosicrucians who flourished during the Age of Enlightenment.
 In 1670, the Abbé Nicolas-Pierre-Henri de Montfaucon de Villars published the thinly disguised occult fiction, Le Comte de Gabalis ("The Count Of Gabalis"), sub-titled Entretiens sur les Sciences Secrètes ("Conversations On Secret Sciences"). Having disclosed secret knowledge allegedly led to the Abbot's murder by Rosicrucians in 1675.
 In 1731, the Abbé Jean Terrasson wrote Séthos, Histoire ou Vie Tirée des Monuments, Anecdotes de l'Ancienne Égypte ("Story or Life Drawn from Monuments & Anecdotes from Ancient Egypt"), whose pseudo-Egyptian and occult themes were later tapped by Wolfgang Amadeus Mozart for his opera The Magic Flute.
 Cazotte's Le Diable amoureux (The Devil in Love, 1772) was sub-titled un roman fantastique, the first time in literary history that a work was so labeled. The Devil in Love could be considered the first modern French horror novel. In it, a young nobleman conjures up a demon who assumes the shape of a beautiful woman. The supernatural was not treated as a fantasmagory, or for satirical or philosophical purposes. It was intended to be real and to induce fear in the reader.
 Another work in the same vein was Vathek, a novel written directly into French in 1787 by English-born writer William Thomas Beckford. A Byronic figure steeped in occult knowledge and sexual perversions, Beckford allegedly wrote his novel non-stop in three days and two nights in a state of trance.
 Finally, in 1813, the very strange Le Manuscrit Trouvé à Saragosse ("The Manuscript Found in Saragossa") was published. Like Vathek, it was written directly into French by a non-French writer, the Polish count and scientist Jan Potocki.

19th century
The 19th century was a period of great turmoil in French history.  After the French Revolution, France successively experienced Napoléon's First Empire, the Bourbon Restoration, the Second Republic, Napoleon III's Second Empire and the Third Republic.  During the First and Second Empires, periods of proud, military glory alternated with crushing, humiliating defeats. It was in this ever-boiling cauldron of historical upheaval that French literature exploded into a bouquet of heretofore unknown and abundant colors—and so did the fantastique.

French fantastique writers of the 19th century were diversely influenced by the English Gothic novel writers, especially Ann Radcliffe, Matthew Gregory Lewis, Sheridan Le Fanu, and Charles Maturin, German author E. T. A. Hoffmann and composer Richard Wagner, American writer Edgar Allan Poe, British poets Lord Byron and Oscar Wilde.

It was during this incredibly rich century that we started seeing a split between the more lurid and exploitative fantastique dubbed fantastique populaire, and the more literary forms adopted by mainstream writers, dubbed fantastique littéraire.

Romans noirs
As the 19th century was about to begin, the English gothic novels became a major influence on the development of the fantastique.  Their extravagant and macabre nature tapped into the emotions released during the French Revolution, and eventually helped the genre to seamlessly evolve into the more modern forms of the fantastique.

The English gothic writers helped launch a wave of what the French called romans noirs (black novels), or romans frénétiques (frantic novels), which became the first subgenre of popular literature. Notable works in that category include:
 Coelina, ou l'Enfant du Mystère [Coelina, or The Child Of Mystery] (1799) by François Guillaume Ducray-Duminil.
 Cyprien Bérard's Lord Rutwen ou les Vampires (1820), which was adapted into a stage play by Charles Nodier the same year, and starred John William Polidori's vampire character Lord Ruthven.
 Falthurne (1820) by Honoré de Balzac, a novel about a virgin prophetess who knows occult secrets that date all the way back to Ancient Mesopotamia. Also of note by Balzac: Le Centenaire [The Centenarian], inspired by Melmoth the Wanderer (1822), L'Élixir de Longue Vie [The Elixir Of Long Life] (1830), Louis Lambert (1832), about a man seeking higher dimensions, the aptly named La Recherche de l'Absolu [The Search For The Absolute] (1834), whose hero is an alchemist, and Melmoth Réconcilié [Melmoth Reconciled] (1835).
 Charles Nodier with Smarra ou les Démons de la Nuit [Smarra, or The Demons Of The Night] (1821), a series of terrifying dream-based tales.  Nodier's masterpiece was La Fée aux Miettes [The Crumb Fairy] (1832).  In it, a young carpenter is devoted to the eponymous Fairy, who may be the legendary Queen of Sheba.  In order to restore her to her true form, he searches for the magical Singing Mandragore.  Nodier could rightfully lay claim to being one of the world's first "high fantasy" writers, sixty years before William Morris.
 The three-volume La Vampire (1825) by Étienne-Léon de Lamothe-Langon which tells the story of a young Napoleonic army officer who bring his Hungarian fiancée home to later discover that she is a vampire, and Le Diable [The Devil] (1832) featuring the charismatic, evil Chevalier Draxel.
 Victor Hugo with Han d'Islande [Han Of Iceland] (1823), a bloody tale featuring a Viking warrior and a mythical bear, Bug-Jargal (1826) and the morbid and romantic L'Homme qui Rit a.k.a. The Man Who Laughs (1869) about a horribly disfigured man who lived in 17th century England. (Its 1928 film version, starring Conrad Veidt, was credited as the model for Batman's the Joker.)
 Frédéric Soulié with the classic Les Mémoires du Diable [The Devil's Memoirs] (1838) which combined the roman frénétique with the passions of the Marquis de Sade.

Fantastique populaire
Eventually, the roman noir gave way to more modern forms of the fantastique.  One was the feuilleton, stories serialized in daily instalments in newspapers; the other was the popular novel, published in inexpensive formats, catering to large audiences.  In the true tradition of popular fiction, these were often considered cheap thrills, good only for the barely educated masses.

 Alexandre Dumas, père was finely attuned to the literary marketplace.  The success of Hoffmann's Tales and of the Thousand And One Nights influenced him to write Les Mille et Un Fantômes [A Thousand And One Ghosts] (1849), an anthology of macabre tales. Dumas wrote his own version of Lord Ruthwen in Le Vampire (1851).  Finally, in 1857, he penned one of the first modern werewolf stories, Le Meneur de Loups [The Leader Of Wolves].
 Edgar Quinet wrote Ahasvérus (1833), a lengthy and sophisticated poetic narrative about the Wandering Jew, and a remarkable book about Merlin, Merlin l'Enchanteur [Merlin The Enchanter] (1895).
 Eugène Sue's own Wandering Jew narrative, Le Juif Errant [The Wandering Jew], was serialized in 1844–45. Dumas' Isaac Laquedem appeared in 1853.
 Paul Féval, père was one of the most important fantastique writers of the period with Les Revenants [Revenants] (1853), La Fille du Juif Errant [The Daughter Of The Wandering Jew] (1864), the macabre La Vampire [The Vampire Countess] (1867), and La Ville Vampire [The Vampire City] (1874) which parodied Ann Radcliffe, making her the book's fictional heroine!

Fantastique littéraire
On the more respectable side of the literary fence, the 19th century fantastique literature after 1830 was dominated by the influence of E. T. A. Hoffmann, and then by that of Edgar Allan Poe.

 In 1839, Gérard de Nerval collaborated with Alexandre Dumas on L'Alchimiste [The Alchemist]. Mentally unhinged after a lover's death, Nerval developed an interest in mystical beliefs, especially in his book Les Illuminés.  Note that after being institutionalized, his work began taking on an increasing visionary quality, though non-fantastique with Aurélia (1853–54) and Les Filles du Feu [Daughters of Fire] (1854).
 In La Morte Amoureuse (1836), Théophile Gautier told the story of a young priest who falls in love with a beautiful female vampire.  In it, the vampire is not a soulless creature, but a loving and erotic woman. Gautier's Avatar (1856) and Spirite (1866) are roman spirites which deal with the theme of life after death.
 Prosper Mérimée's La Vénus d'Ille (1837), features a pagan statue that comes to life and kills a young groom on his wedding night
 Rustic legends of the Alsace were also the main source of inspiration of Émile Erckmann and Alexandre Chatrian, a writing team who signed their works Erckmann-Chatrian. Their first collection, Les Contes Fantastiques [Fantastic Tales] (1847), includes the classic short story L'Araignée Crabe [The Crab-Spider], about a blood-sucking lake monster with the body of a spider and the head of a man.
 Jules Amédée Barbey d'Aurevilly wrote tales of terror in which morbid passions are acted out in bizarre crimes, such as Les Diaboliques [The Diabolical Women] (written in 1858, published in 1874, no relation to the movie). Also of note is  L'Ensorcelé.
 In 1858, Gustave Flaubert produced what may very well be the first work of modern French heroic fantasy, Salammbô, a brash, colorful and exotic novel about ancient Carthage.
 Joris-Karl Huysmans created new dramatic templates for old concepts, such as the Devil, witchcraft, etc. in books such as À Rebours [Against Nature] (1884) and Là-Bas [Down There] (1891).
 Guy de Maupassant followed in the footsteps of Poe, and anticipated H. P. Lovecraft, becoming obsessed with the notion of slow descent into madness caused by fearsome otherworldly forces. His masterpiece was Le Horla (1887), which was the basis for the 1963 film Diary of a Madman.  In it, it is revealed that Man shared the Earth with invisible beings of great powers to whom we are only cattle.
 The eclectic Villiers de l'Isle-Adam whose macabre Contes Cruels [Cruel Tales] (1883) and Tribulat Bonhomet (1887) were also inspired by Poe.
 Marcel Schwob with the classic Le Roi au Masque d'Or [The King In The Golden Mask] (1892).
 Jean Lorrain, also obsessed with the nature of evil, with Buveurs d'Âmes [Soul Drinkers] (1893), "Les contes d'un buveur d'éther", the kabbalistic novel La Mandragore (1899) and Monsieur de Phocas (1901).
 Octave Mirbeau's sadistic and mean-spirited tales of murders, cannibalism and ghostly revenge collected in Le Jardin des Supplices [Torture Garden] (1899).
 Belgian poet Maurice Maeterlinck won the Nobel Prize for Literature in 1911.  The author of the classic Pelléas et Mélisande (1892) wrote the perennial classic L'Oiseau Bleu [The Blue Bird] (1908), an allegorical fantasy conceived as a play for children.
 Also from Belgium, Franz Hellens, a precursor of the surrealists, displayed a lyrical, romantic approach to fantasy.  Les Hors-le-Vent [The Out-Wind] (1909) and Nocturnal (1919) explored into the land of dreams, which he dubbed the "second life",  while his novel Mélusine (1920) was generally considered a pre-surrealist novel.

20th century prior to World War II
The confidence displayed by French Society in the early 1900s was sapped by the slaughter of World War I in which, out of 8 million Frenchmen drafted, 1.3 million were killed and 1 million severely crippled.  Large sections of France were devastated and industrial production fell by 60%.  In French literature, the Dadaist and Surrealist movements exemplified that desire to break violently with the past

The split between fantastique populaire and fantastique littéraire was definitively formed.  The former was written by writers walking in the footsteps of Dumas, Sue and Féval, the latter by successors of Hoffmann, Poe and the symbolists.

Fantastique populaire
Between the wars, the fantastique populaire continued to cater to the masses by providing cheap entertainment in the form of feuilletons: pulp magazines such as Le Journal des Voyages (1877–1947), Lectures Pour Tous (1898–1940) and L'Intrépide (1910–1937) and paperbacks from publishers such as Ollendorff, Méricant, Férenczi and Tallandier. Significant names of the times include:

 Belgian Jean Ray is considered the most famous and influential author of fantastique of the period and is generally regarded by genre scholars as the French-language equivalent of Poe and Lovecraft.  Ray began his career as a pulp writer, using a variety of aliases, and had several stories published in Weird Tales. His output can be divided into three parts. Short stories steeped in the rich, mist-shrouded atmosphere of his native Flanders; a few novels, including the classic Malpertuis (1943) and rewritten translations of an unauthorized Sherlock Holmes pastiche, Harry Dickson. His close friend and citizen-fellow Michel de Ghelderode (Le Grand Macabre) was another contemporary Belgian auteur fantastique.
 Gaston Leroux with La Double Vie de Theophraste Longuet [The Double Life Of Theophraste Longuet] (1903), in which a retired merchant is possessed by the spirit of 18th century French highwayman Cartouche; the Hoffmannesque L'Homme qui a Vu le Diable [The Man Who Saw The Devil] (1908); the classic Le Fantôme de l'Opéra a.k.a. The Phantom of the Opera (1910) and Le Coeur Cambriolé [The Burglared Heart] (1920).
 Marcel Allain and Pierre Souvestre who unleashed their character Fantômas, the first modern sociopathic villain, in 1911.
 André de Lorde, nicknamed the "Prince of Terror", a prolific playwright who wrote over one hundred and fifty plays for the Grand Guignol theater,  collected in various volumes, including Théâtre d'Épouvante [Theater Of Horror] (1909), Théâtre Rouge [Red Theater] (1922), Les Drames Célèbres du Grand-Guignol [Famous Tragedies Of The Grand-Guignol] (1924) and Théâtre de la Peur [Theater Of Fear] (1924).
 Arthur Bernède, creator of Judex (1919) and Belphégor (1928).
 Claude Farrère, the first recipient of the French Prix Goncourt literary award, wrote La Maison des Hommes Vivants [The House Of Living Men] (1911) in which a sect of immortals, founded by the Count of St Germain, steals others' life forces in order to preserve their own immortality.
 One of the most distinctive genre writers of the 1930s, who also blended genres with deceptive facility, was Pierre Véry, whose mystery novels always incorporated surreal or supernatural elements.  Some of his works squarely belonged in the fantasy genre, such as Le Pays sans Étoiles [The Starless Country] (1945) and Tout Doit Disparaître le 5 Mai [Everything Must Go On May 5] (1961), a collection of fantastic tales.

Fantastique littéraire
In French literature, the Dadaist and Surrealist movements exemplified the desire to break violently with the past, but the more conventional forms of the novel remained otherwise less innovative.  The only new foreign influence was that of Henry James.  A non-literary influence, especially on the surrealists, was that of Sigmund Freud. Some of the major contributors of the period include:

 Dadaism began as a nihilistic artistic movement that paralleled the political anarchist movements of the times.  In France, it was heralded by Guillaume Apollinaire with L'Enchanteur Pourrissant [The Rotting Enchanter] (1909), a poetic dialog between Merlin and Viviane, and  L'Hérésiarque et Cie. (1910), a collection of short stories written between 1899 and 1910, dealing with a variety of fantasy themes such as magic, invisibility, etc.
 In La Révolte des anges [The Revolt Of The Angels] (1914), Anatole France wrote a startling tale in which the Fallen angel Arcade schemes to organize a new revolt among the fallen angels who are living on Earth, posing as artists.
 Guillaume Apollinaire was the first, true herald of surrealism. By the time of his death, in 1918, he had made it possible for the never-ending search for the bizarre in literature to be viewed not just as an amusing but pointless game, but as a true method, a metaphysical quest, reflecting more profound concerns and higher literary ambitions.
 Blaise Cendrars openly declared his admiration for Gustave Le Rouge.  His La Fin du Monde Filmée par l'Ange [The End Of The World Filmed By An Angel] (1919) and Moravagine (1926) are surrealist novels, the latter named after, and telling the story of, an evil madman whose crimes rival those of Fantômas, a character much appreciated by the Surrealists.
 Pierre Benoit's classic L'Atlantide (1919) was a superb variation on a theme introduced by H. Rider Haggard in She, and told the story of two French Officers who find the lost city of Atlantis in the midst of the Sahara, and fall in love with its beautiful queen, Antinea. It was filmed several times.
 The Faustian Marguerite de la Nuit [Marguerite Of The Night] (1922), by Pierre Mac Orlan, was also made into a film.
 Jean Cocteau produced such acclaimed works as the poems of L'Ange Heurtebise [The Angel Heurtebise] (1925), the plays Orphée [Orpheus] (1926) and Les Chevaliers de la Table Ronde [The Knights Of The Round Table] (1937), and the hauntingly beautiful and surreal 1945 film version of La Belle et la Bête a.k.a. Beauty and the Beast.
 Jules Supervielle, a writer of Basque descent, incorporated Hispanic vistas and fantasy themes in his novel L'Enfant de la Haute Mer [The Child From The High Sea] (1931).
 One of the greatest literary figures in Belgian history was eccentric playwright Michel de Ghelderode, a true visionary whose folkish morality plays and stories resonated with Hieronymus Bosch-like humor and fantasy. Magie Rouge [Red Magic] (1934) and La Ballade du Grand Macabre [The Ballad Of The Great Macabre] (1935) brought to life the macabre tradition of Flemish culture.
 Belgian author Henri Michaux created a series of novels which read like voyages extraordinaires of the surreal with Voyage en Grande Garabagne [Voyage In Great Garabagne] (1936), Au Pays de la Magie [In The Land Of Magic] (1941) and Ici, Poddema [Here, Poddema] (1946), creating imaginary lands, peopled with colorful inhabitants who followed strange customs.
 Playwright Jean Giraudoux combined tragedy, humor and fantasy in Intermezzo (1937), where a timid ghost revolutionizes a small town, and Ondine (1939) about a water sprite who falls in love with a mortal.
 Julien Gracq's first novel, The Castle of Argol (1938) combined the effects of the roman noir with the poetry of Arthur Rimbaud.  The book takes place in a Gormenghast-like castle where the young owner, his friend and the beautiful Heide spend their time playing morbid and decadent games.  In 1951, Gracq published the brilliant The Opposing Shore (1951) which won the Prix Goncourt and takes place in the fictional country of Orsenna.
 Finally, Marcel Aymé deserves a special mention for his humorous and fantastic universe that combines wit and social satire with fantasy, in works such as Le Passe-Muraille [The Walker Through The Walls] (1943) about an obscure clerk who acquires the power to walk through solid objects and his animal fables,  [The Tales of the Crouching Cat] (1931).

20th century post World War II
World War II exacted both a huge physical and psychological toll on French culture.  France's defeat in 1940, followed by four years of occupation, confronted writers with choices they never before had to face.  The discovery of the atom bomb and the Cold War introduced sharp new fears. Mainstream French culture increasingly frowned upon works of imagination and preferred instead to embrace the more naturalistic and political concerns of the existentialists such as Jean-Paul Sartre and Albert Camus. Yet, paradoxically, despite being marginalized by critics and the literary establishment, the fantastique thrived as never before, both in terms of quality and quantity.

Significant foreign influences on French modern fantastique include Franz Kafka, Jorge Luis Borges, H. P. Lovecraft, Dino Buzzati, Julio Cortázar, Vladimir Nabokov and Richard Matheson.  Other more recent influences included Stephen King, Clive Barker, J. R. R. Tolkien and Robert E. Howard, none of whom were well known in France before the early 1980s. The growth in popularity of heroic fantasy during the last decade is a tribute to the Americanization of world culture. In Latin America of the 21st century, authors such as César Aira, Roberto Bolaño, José Baroja, Andrés Neuman, Juan Gabriel Vásquez, Jorge Volpi, among others, stand out.

Some of the most interesting authors and works up to the 1980s are:

 Marcel Béalu's fantasy followed the path of Hoffman, Poe and Gérard de Nerval.  In his stories, hapless souls became slowly trapped in dream-like realities where inhuman forces held sway. L'Expérience de la Nuit [The Experience Of Night] (1945) deals with the power to see into other dimensions. L'Araignée d'Eau [The Water Spider] (1948) is about an impossible love between a man and a watery creature who slowly turns into a girl.
 Marcel Brion's approach of the supernatural almost always referred to the romantic tradition and the search for a mystical absolute. His most famous collection of stories is Les Escales de la Haute Nuit [The Shore Leaves Of The Deepest Night] (1942).
 André Pieyre de Mandiargues' gift was to make the invisible visible with an implacable sense of logic and an almost maniacal precision.  His stories are collected in Le Musée Noir [The Black Museum] (1946) and Soleil des Loups [The Sun Of The Wolves] (1951).
 André Dhôtel used adolescents as protagonists to make us experience wondrous events, always presented in a disturbingly matter-of-fact way, in La Chronique Fabuleuse [The Fabulous Chronicle] (1955) and Le Pays où l'on n'arrive Jamais [The Unreachable Country] (1955).
 Noël Devaulx' own brand of fantastique relied of the intrusion of strange and unexplainable into everyday reality.  His short stories were dubbed "parables without keys."  His best collections are L'Auberge Parpillon [The Parpillon Inn] (1945) and Le Pressoir Mystique [The Mystic Press] (1948).
 The prolific Claude Seignolle's brand of fantastique was influenced by his "sorcerous childhood" spent in the misty plains of his native Sologne, and a terrifying encounter with the Devil incarnated in a local warlock which he claimed to have experienced at age 15 in 1932.  This conferred a real sense of authenticity to Seignolle's books, which were almost devoid of any literary artifices.  His major works include La Malvenue [The Illcome] (1952) and the collections Histoires Maléfiques [Maleficent Tales] (1965) and Contes Macabres [Macabre Stories] (1966).
 One writer who defied any attempt at classification was Pierre Gripari who first wrote  truculent, colorful genre novels, such as La Vie, la Mort et la Resurrection de Socrate-Marie Gripotard [Life, Death And Resurrection Of Socrate-Marie Gripotard] (1968), about a Candide-like superman and L'Incroyable Equipée de Phosphore Noloc [The Incredible Voyage Of Phosphore Noloc] (1964), an homage to Jules Verne in which the hero discovers that our cosmos is really inside a woman's womb, before penning modern fairy tales such as Contes de la Rue Broca [Tales Of Broca Street] (1967), which became very popular in the 1980s.
 Christia Sylf's Kobor Tigan't (1969) and its sequel, Le Règne de Ta [The Reign Of Ta] (1971), take place 30,000 years ago, during the reign of the Giants, a mythical pre-Atlantean race.  The novels tell of the conflict between the sorcerous Queen-Mother, Abim, and her daughters Opak, who rules Kobor Tigan’t, the five-levelled City of the Giants, and her sister, Ta.  The world of Kobor Tigan’t is inhabited by a race of reptilian bisexual humanoids, theT’los, who are used as sex slaves by the Giants.  The novels also features the crystal-like Elohim, messengers of alien powers from beyond.  The Kobor Tigan’t novels cannot be compared to anything published in England or America.  They contain erotic scenes as well as esoteric elements that one rarely finds in the literary worlds of Tolkien or Howard.
 Charles Duits belonged to the same rich and colorful tradition.  With Ptah Hotep (1971) and Nefer (1978), he wrote a heroic-fantasy saga that takes place on a parallel Earth with two moons—Athenade and Thana—during the time of Ancient Egypt and the Roman Empire.

Other notable authors include:
 Pierre Barbet
 Michel Bernanos
 Jean-Louis Bouquet
 Serge Brussolo
 
 Georges-Olivier Châteaureynaud
 Lise Deharme
 Alain Dorémieux
 
 Nathalie Henneberg
 Rockne S. O'Bannon
 
 
 
 Jacques Sadoul
 Marcel Schneider
 
 Jacques Sternberg
 Roland Topor
 Julia Verlanger

Awards
Some Awards for French-language fantastique include or have includes the Grand Prix de l'Imaginaire (1974– ), the Prix Julia Verlanger (1986– ), the Prix Ozone (1977–2000) and the Prix Tour Eiffel (1997–2002).

Every year since 1994 the Fantastic'Arts festival awards Fantastique films in the French town of Gerardmer. It was preceded by the Avoriaz International Fantastic Film Festival, a similar event.

See also
Fantastic
French science fiction

References

 French Science Fiction, Fantasy, Horror and Pulp Fiction by Jean-Marc Lofficier & Randy Lofficier  .

Fantasy genres
French literature
Horror genres